The 1999 Montana State Bobcats football team was an American football team that represented Montana State University in the Big Sky Conference during the 1999 NCAA Division I-AA football season. In their eighth and final season under head coach Cliff Hysell, the Bobcats compiled a 3–8 record (2–6 against Big Sky opponents) and finished in a three-way tie for last place in the Big Sky. The Bobcats dropped their 14th consecutive game in the Montana–Montana State football rivalry. The team played its home games at the newly christened Martell Field.

Schedule

References

Montana State
Montana State Bobcats football seasons
Montana State Bobcats football